"Accident of Birth" is the first single from Bruce Dickinson's fourth solo album, Accident of Birth, released in 1997 and peaking at number 54 in the UK Singles Chart. Dickinson described the song as "about a family from Hell. Except they're in Hell and one of them has accidentally been born, and they want him back and he doesn't want to go. For all the same reasons that you wouldn't want to go back to your family if they're a pain in the ass, he doesn't want to go back to his family. OK, so they're in Hell, that makes a little difference too."

Music video
The song's music video was directed by Bruce Dickinson and was shot on the same day as the video to "Road to Hell" from the same album.

Track listing 
Part I
 "Accident of Birth" – 4:23
 "Ghost Of Cain" – 4:13
 "Accident of Birth (demo)" – 4:16

Part II
 "Accident of Birth" – 4:23
 "Starchildren (demo)" – 5:04
 "Taking The Queen (demo)" – 4:33

Credits
 Bruce Dickinson – Vocals
 Adrian Smith – Guitar
 Roy Z –  Guitar
 Eddie Casillas – Bass
 David Ingraham – Drums

Chart positions

References 

1997 singles
Bruce Dickinson songs
Songs written by Bruce Dickinson
Songs written by Roy Z
1997 songs
EMI Records singles